Estoy hecho un demonio is a 1972 Argentine film.

Cast
 Francis Smith
 Juan Carlos Dual
 Ubaldo Martínez
 Santiago Bal
 Ricardo Dupont
 Marilú
 Cuny Vera
 Ricardo Méndez
 Jorge Barreiro
 Carlos Scazziota 
 Ulises Dumont
 Gloria Gago
 Ricardo Lavié
 Osvaldo Terranova
 Hugo Caprera

External links
 

1972 films
Argentine musical films
1970s Spanish-language films
1970s Argentine films